Nizhny Kushcher is a rural locality (a village) in Kozmodemyanskoye Rural Settlement, Karagaysky District, Perm Krai, Russia. The population was 188 as of 2010. There are 4 streets.

Geography 
Verkhny Kushcher is the nearest rural locality.

References 

Rural localities in Karagaysky District